BTV was a local television station in Bergen, Norway. It was owned by the largest local newspaper in Norway, Bergens Tidende.

Programs
Apart from news, the station also shows popular programs like Bøljan and Valgbar.

The channel was launched as TVHordaland in 1996. Programs from TVNorge were broadcast when BTV doesn't broadcast any programs. It has transmitters in Bergen and other locations in Hordaland county.

References

Mass media in Bergen
Defunct television channels in Norway
Television channels and stations established in 1996